2C or II-C may refer to:
 2C (psychedelics), a family of psychedelic phenethylamines
 Alpha-2C adrenergic receptor in biochemistry
 Apple IIc, a personal computer introduced by Apple Computer in April 1984
 Char 2C, a French heavy tank developed during World War I
 Long March 2C, a Chinese rocket
 Oflag II-C, a World War II German Army Prisoner-of-war camp located near Woldenburg
 2 cents (disambiguation), a coin in certain realms
 Second Cambridge Catalogue of Radio Sources
 Two's complement, a system for representing signed integers on computers
 2C Media, a television production company based in Miami, Florida
 In the law of New Jersey, the New Jersey Code of Criminal Justice (Title 2C of the New Jersey Statutes)
2C (musician), a Liberian musician and songwriter

See also
 C2 (disambiguation)
 IIC (disambiguation)